The ITF Women's Circuit – Hong Kong is a tournament for professional female tennis players played on outdoor hardcourts. The event is classified as a $25,000 ITF Women's Circuit tournament and was first held in Hong Kong in 2015.

Past finals

Singles

Doubles

External links
 ITF search 
 Official website

ITF Women's World Tennis Tour
Hard court tennis tournaments
Tennis tournaments in Hong Kong
Recurring events established in 2015
2015 establishments in Hong Kong